Westbourne, Manitoba is an unincorporated community northwest of Portage la Prairie, Manitoba, Canada on the Yellowhead Highway. It is part of the Municipality of WestLake – Gladstone. The post office was opened in 1871 as White Mud River and became Westbourne in 1873.

References 

 Geographic Names of Manitoba (pg. 292) - the Millennium Bureau of Canada

Settlements in Manitoba
Unincorporated communities in Manitoba